Tadashi Horino (August 14, 1921 — October 3, 2002) was an American film and television actor.

Career

Selected filmography
Tadashi Horino had an impressive career in film and television.  He appeared in such films as The Kentucky Fried Movie, Go Tell the Spartans, Oh, God! Book II, Bachelor Party, Red Sonja, Remote Control, Bill & Ted's Bogus Journey, Teenage Mutant Ninja Turtles III, Surf Ninjas, Brother, Mulholland Drive and Kung Pow! Enter the Fist. On television he appeared in the shows I Spy, The Wackiest Ship in the Army, several episodes of Kung Fu, M*A*S*H, Mannix, Charlie's Angels, Wonder Woman, Night Court, Amazing Stories, and Tour of Duty, Columbo.

Death
Horino died in Los Angeles, California, at age 81.

Filmography

References

External links

1921 births
2002 deaths
American male film actors
American male television actors
20th-century American male actors